Stilbocarpa polaris, commonly known as the Macquarie Island cabbage, is a species of flowering plant usually placed in the family Araliaceae and only very distantly related to cabbage. It is a megaherb, growing up to about a metre in height, native to the subantarctic islands of New Zealand and to Australia’s Macquarie Island.

Uses 

S. polaris was used as a food source and a scurvy preventative by early explorers and sealers.

Conservation status 

It is classified as "At Risk - Naturally Uncommon" in the New Zealand threatened plants classification system. On Macquarie Island, it was threatened by introduced black rats and European rabbits, until their eradication in 2011.

References 

Araliaceae
Flora of New Zealand
Flora of Tasmania
Flora of Macquarie Island
Flora of the Campbell Islands
Flora of the Auckland Islands
Plants described in 1854